Turbat International Airport  (Balochi: تُربت بالی پٹ ) is located at Turbat, Balochistan, Pakistan. It has the largest land area within the province of Balochistan. It is the second largest airport in Balochistan, after Quetta International Airport. The airport is located 5 km south of the city. The airport caters to the population of Turbat and the surrounding areas of Pidarak, Karkiabdar and Kalatak.

History
Due to its geographical location, the airport has been only catering to the regional traffic it receives from its local city, Turbat, but the surrounding towns and villages as well. The airport started out in the mid-1970s, when the Civil Aviation Authority of Pakistan constructed a runway and an apron to handle small turboprop aircraft. A year later, Pakistan International Airlines launched flights to the airport using Fokker F-27 Friendship aircraft. Due to lack of flights, PIA carried out their own handling at the airport and obtained responsibility of handling the airport operations. PIA offices were inaugurated and allowed the airline to carry out the tasks at the airport.

In 1979, the airport underwent a radical make-over that resulted in a re-carpeted runway as well as apron. A lounge for domestic arrival and departures was constructed in 1980. In 1983, a briefing area was constructed to allow family members of passengers seeing off their relatives, as well as an air traffic control building. The main road to the airport was re-developed and constructed to meet international standards by 1984. The Pakistan State Oil decided to provide aviation fuel to flights handled at the airport and built their own facility in 1994. The CAA of Pakistan decided to re-develop the airport in 2000, which housed the CAA administration office as well as a new ATC building. In 2003, a new arrivals lounge was constructed as well as a premium lounge for Commercially Important Persons (CIPs). A DVLS room was constructed in 2005. Customs and immigration facilities were upgraded in the same year. In 2008 a new office building for airlines and airport operational staff were inaugurated. The local government and the CAA have reported to be upgrading the airport to meet international standards in 2009 with new lounges, control tower and more apron space to handle more flights.

Until very recently Pakistan International Airlines was the only airline operating from the airport, however Sharjah-based carrier Orbit Aviation has obtained clearance from the Pakistan Civil Aviation Authority to start twice weekly flights between Sharjah and Turbat via Gwadar. The company has yet to begin flights, although facilities and permissions are already in place for it to do so. airblue has also announced that it intends to start flying to Turbat in the future after it started regular flights to Gwadar. The national carrier also launched operations to the capital of Oman, Muscat in 2008 & Sharjah U.A.E

Structure 
Since the airport mainly caters to meet the need for local travellers and tourist passengers, it is regarded ideal to meet the number of flights and operations it has forecast for the future. However, with air travel on the rise, more is being invested at the airport to meet future needs. A new departure lounge was constructed and has been operational since 25 December 2012.

Runway
6,000 ft runway with dimensions 1829 m by 30 m
Apron
For passenger and cargo, 91 m by 69 m area.
Combination of flexible and rigid pavements made of bitumen.
Nose-in parking for two narrow-bodied aircraft such as ATR/F-27 at a time.
Lounge
One domestic and international lounge each.
Snack bar/tea shop available.
Newsagents/gift shop on premises.
Facility of restaurant of cooked meals (curry with roti, cold drink, dessert, and cup of tea) available 1.8 kilometres from terminal building. Transport is easily available
Additional
No aircraft maintenance facility at the moment.
Fire Category at level CAT-4, Ambulance-01, Oshkosh(Striker)-01, Water Bowser-02.
A viewing verandah for enthusiasts, visitors, and various likely persons.
Facility for offering prayer available.
Habib Bank ATM located at a distance of 5 kilometres, linked to Visa and Mastercard, China UnionPay, and to the domestic 1LINK, MNET and PayPak switches. IBFT (Interbank Funds Transfer) facility is also provided at this ATM. This HBL ATM is attached to an HBL branch which also exchanges foreign currency, initiates SWIFT and FEDWIRE transfers, and does RAAST real-time money transfer transactions.
 Recently terminal building extended as passenger flow extended.

Airlines and destinations

Events
 PIA Flight 544 carrying 30 passengers on a Fokker F-27 originated at the airport bound for Gwadar. Mid-flight the aircraft was taken over by Baloch militants. The aircraft landed at Hyderabad Airport where commandos overtook the aircraft.

See also 
 List of airports in Pakistan
 Airlines of Pakistan
 Transport in Pakistan

References

External links 
 
 CAA Pakistan – official site

Airports in Balochistan, Pakistan
International airports in Pakistan